Sir Benjamin Thompson, Count Rumford, FRS (March 26, 1753August 21, 1814) was a British physicist, born in Colonial Massachusetts, and inventor whose challenges to established physical theory were part of the 19th-century revolution in thermodynamics. He served as lieutenant-colonel of the King's American Dragoons, part of the British Loyalist forces, during the American Revolutionary War. After the end of the war he moved to London, where his administrative talents were recognized when he was appointed a full colonel, and in 1784 he received a knighthood from King George III. A prolific designer, Thompson also drew designs for warships. He later moved to Bavaria and entered government service there, being appointed Bavarian Army Minister and re-organizing the army, and, in 1792, was made a Count of the Holy Roman Empire.

Early years
Thompson was born in rural Woburn, in the Province of Massachusetts Bay, on March 26, 1753; his birthplace is preserved as a museum. He was educated mainly at the village school, although he sometimes walked almost ten miles to Cambridge with the older Loammi Baldwin to attend lectures by Professor John Winthrop of Harvard College. At the age of 13 he was apprenticed to John Appleton, a merchant of nearby Salem. Thompson excelled at his trade, and coming in contact with refined and well educated people for the first time, adopted many of their characteristics including an interest in science. While recuperating in Woburn in 1769 from an injury, Thompson conducted experiments concerning the nature of heat and began to correspond with Loammi Baldwin and others about them. Later that year he worked for a few months for a Boston shopkeeper and then apprenticed himself briefly, and unsuccessfully, to a doctor in Woburn.

Thompson's prospects were dim in 1772 but in that year they changed abruptly. He met, charmed and married a rich and well-connected heiress named Sarah Rolfe (née Walker). Her father was a minister, and her late husband left her property at Rumford, Province of New Hampshire, which is today in the modern city of Concord.  They moved to Portsmouth, and through his wife's influence with the governor, he was appointed a major in the New Hampshire Militia.  Their child (also named Sarah) was born in 1774.

American Revolutionary War
When the American Revolutionary War began Thompson was a man of property and standing in New England and was opposed to the uprising. He was active in recruiting loyalists to fight the rebels. This earned him the enmity of the popular party, and a mob attacked Thompson's house. He fled to the British lines, abandoning his wife, as it turned out, permanently. Thompson was welcomed by the British to whom he gave valuable information about the American forces, and became an advisor to both General Gage and Lord George Germain.

While working with the British armies in America he conducted experiments to measure the force of gunpowder, the results of which were widely acclaimed when published in 1781 in the Philosophical Transactions of the Royal Society. On the strength of this he arrived in London at the end of the war with a reputation as a scientist.

Bavarian maturity 

In 1785, he moved to Bavaria where he became an aide-de-camp to the Prince-elector Charles Theodore. He spent eleven years in Bavaria, reorganizing the army and establishing workhouses for the poor. He also invented Rumford's Soup, a soup for the poor, and established the cultivation of the potato in Bavaria.  He studied methods of cooking, heating, and lighting, including the relative costs and efficiencies of wax candles, tallow candles, and oil lamps.
On Prince Charles' behalf he created the Englischer Garten in Munich in 1789; it remains today and is known as one of the largest urban public parks in the world. He was elected a Foreign Honorary Member of the American Academy of Arts and Sciences in 1789.

For his efforts, in 1791 Thompson was made a Count of the Holy Roman Empire, becoming Reichsgraf von Rumford (English: Imperial Count of Rumford). He took the name "Rumford" after the town of Rumford, New Hampshire, which was an older name for Concord where he had been married.

Science and engineering

Experiments on heat
His experiments on gunnery and explosives led to an interest in heat. He devised a method for measuring the specific heat of a solid substance but was disappointed when Johan Wilcke published his parallel discovery first.

Thompson next investigated the insulating properties of various materials, including fur, wool and feathers. He correctly appreciated that the insulating properties of these natural materials arise from the fact that they inhibit the convection of air. He then made the somewhat reckless, and incorrect, inference that air and, in fact, all gases, were perfect non-conductors of heat. He further saw this as evidence of the argument from design, contending that divine providence had arranged for fur on animals in such a way as to guarantee their comfort.  

In 1797, he extended his claim about non-conductivity to liquids. The idea raised considerable objections from the scientific establishment, John Dalton and John Leslie making particularly forthright attacks. Instrumentation far exceeding anything available in terms of accuracy and precision would have been needed to verify Thompson's claim. Again, he seems to have been influenced by his theological beliefs and it is likely that he wished to grant water a privileged and providential status in the regulation of human life.

He is considered the founder of the sous-vide food preparation method owing to his experiment with a mutton shoulder. He described this method in one of his essays.

Mechanical equivalent of heat

Rumford's most important scientific work took place in Munich, and centred on the nature of heat, which he contended in "An Experimental Enquiry Concerning the Source of the Heat which is Excited by Friction" (1798) was not the caloric of then-current scientific thinking but a form of motion. Rumford had observed the frictional heat generated by boring cannon at the arsenal in Munich. Rumford immersed a cannon barrel in water and arranged for a specially blunted boring tool. He showed that the water could be boiled within roughly two and a half hours and that the supply of frictional heat was seemingly inexhaustible. Rumford confirmed that no physical change had taken place in the material of the cannon by comparing the specific heats of the material machined away and that remaining.

Rumford argued that the seemingly indefinite generation of heat was incompatible with the caloric theory. He contended that the only thing communicated to the barrel was motion.

Rumford made no attempt to further quantify the heat generated or to measure the mechanical equivalent of heat. Though this work met with a hostile reception, it was subsequently important in establishing the laws of conservation of energy later in the 19th century.

Calorific and frigorific radiation
He explained Pictet's experiment, which demonstrates the reflection of cold, by supposing that all bodies emit invisible rays, undulations in the ethereal fluid. He did experiments to support his theories of calorific and frigorific radiation and said the communication of heat was the net effect of calorific (hot) rays and frigorific (cold) rays and the rays emitted by the object. When an object absorbs radiation from a warmer object (calorific rays) its temperature rises, and when it absorbs radiation from a colder object (frigorific rays) its temperature falls. See note 8, "An enquiry concerning the nature of heat and the mode of its communication" Philosophical Transactions of the Royal Society, starting at page 112.

Inventions and design improvements

Thompson was an active and prolific inventor, developing improvements for chimneys, fireplaces and industrial furnaces, as well as inventing the double boiler, a kitchen range, and a drip coffeepot. He invented a percolating coffee pot following his pioneering work with the Bavarian Army, where he improved the diet of the soldiers as well as their clothes.

The Rumford fireplace created a sensation in London when he introduced the idea of restricting the chimney opening to increase the updraught, which was a much more efficient way to heat a room than earlier fireplaces. He and his workers modified fireplaces by inserting bricks into the hearth to make the side walls angled, and added a choke to the chimney to increase the speed of air going up the flue. The effect was to produce a streamlined air flow, so all the smoke would go up into the chimney rather than lingering and entering the room. It also had the effect of increasing the efficiency of the fire, and gave extra control of the rate of combustion of the fuel, whether wood or coal. Many fashionable London houses were modified to his instructions, and became smoke-free.

Thompson became a celebrity when news of his success spread. His work was also very profitable, and much imitated when he published his analysis of the way chimneys worked. In many ways, he was similar to Benjamin Franklin, who also invented a new kind of heating stove.

The retention of heat was a recurring theme in his work, as he is also credited with the invention of thermal underwear.

Industrial furnaces

Thompson also significantly improved the design of kilns used to produce quicklime, and Rumford furnaces were soon being constructed throughout Europe. The key innovation involved separating the burning fuel from the limestone, so that the lime produced by the heat of the furnace was not contaminated by ash from the fire.

Light and photometry
Rumford worked in photometry, the measurement of light.  He made a photometer and introduced the standard candle, the predecessor of the candela, as a unit of luminous intensity.  His standard candle was made from the oil of a sperm whale, to rigid specifications. He also published studies of "illusory" or subjective complementary colours, induced by the shadows created by two lights, one white and one coloured; these observations were cited and generalized by Michel-Eugène Chevreul as his "law of simultaneous colour contrast" in 1839.

Later life

After 1799, he divided his time between France and England. With Sir Joseph Banks, he established the Royal Institution of Great Britain in 1799. The pair chose Sir Humphry Davy as the first lecturer. The institution flourished and became world-famous as a result of Davy's pioneering research. His assistant, Michael Faraday, established the Institution as a premier research laboratory, and also justly famous for its series of public lectures popularizing science. That tradition continues to the present, and the Royal Institution Christmas lectures attract large audiences through their TV broadcasts.

Thompson endowed the Rumford medals of the Royal Society and the American Academy of Arts and Sciences, and endowed the Rumford Chair of Physics at Harvard University. In 1803, he was elected a foreign member of the Royal Swedish Academy of Sciences, and as a member of the American Philosophical Society.

In 1804, he married Marie-Anne Lavoisier, the widow of the great French chemist Antoine Lavoisier. (His American wife, Sarah—whom he abandoned at the outbreak of the American Revolution—had died in 1792.) Thompson separated from his second wife after three years, but he settled in Paris and continued his scientific work until his death on August 21, 1814. Thompson is buried in the small cemetery of Auteuil in Paris, just across from Adrien-Marie Legendre. Upon his death, his daughter from his first marriage, Sarah Thompson, inherited his title as Countess Rumford.

Honours
 Colonel, King's American Dragoons.
 Knighted, 1784.
 Count of the Holy Roman Empire, 1791.
 The crater Rumford on the Moon is named after him.
 Rumford baking powder (patented 1859) is named after him, having been invented by a former Rumford professor at Harvard University, Eben Norton Horsford (1818–1893), cofounder of the Rumford Chemical Works of East Providence, RI.
 Rumford Kitchen at the World's Fair in Chicago, 1893.
 A street in the inner city of Munich is named after him.
 Rumford Street (and the nearby Rumford Place) in Liverpool, England, are so named due to a soup kitchen established to Count Rumford's plan which formerly stood on land adjacent to Rumford Street.
 : Order of the White Eagle (1789).

Bibliography
 An Essay on Chimney Fire-Places; With Proposals for Improving Them, to Save Fuel, to Render Dwelling-Houses More Comfortable and Salubrious, and Effectually to Prevent Chimnies from Smoking. Illustrated with Engravings, (1796).
 Collected Works of Count Rumford, Volume I, The Nature of Heat, (1968).
 Collected Works of Count Rumford, Volume II, Practical Applications of Heat, (1969).
 Collected Works of Count Rumford, Volume III, Devices and Techniques, (1969).
 Collected Works of Count Rumford, Volume IV, Light and Armament, (1970).
 Collected Works of Count Rumford, Volume V, Public Institutions, (1970).

See also 
 History of thermodynamics

References

Further reading

External links

 Eric Weisstein's World of Science. "Rumford, Benjamin Thompson". (1753–1814)
 Dr. Hugh C. Rowlinson "The Contribution of Count Rumford to Domestic Life in Jane Austen’s Time" An article not only detailing the Rumford fireplace, but also Rumford's life and other achievements.
 
 
 A Biography of Benjamin Thompson, Jr. Written in 1868
 Escutcheons of Science
 Count Rumford's Birth Place and Museum
 Count Rumford Fireplaces website

1753 births
1814 deaths
Loyalists in the American Revolution from New Hampshire
American physicists
British physicists
Counts of the Holy Roman Empire
Fellows of the American Academy of Arts and Sciences
Fellows of the Royal Society
Members of the Royal Swedish Academy of Sciences
Harvard University people
People from the Duchy of Bavaria
People of colonial Massachusetts
People of colonial New Hampshire
People from Woburn, Massachusetts
Recipients of the Copley Medal
18th-century American people
19th-century American people
18th-century British people
19th-century British people
Recipients of the Order of the White Eagle (Poland)
Thermodynamicists